879 Ricarda is a minor planet orbiting the Sun that was discovered by German astronomer Max Wolf on July 22, 1917.

This is a member of the dynamic Maria family of asteroids that most likely formed as the result of a collisional breakup of a parent body.

It is named after German intellectual Ricarda Huch. Main-belt asteroid 8847 Huch is also named after her.

References

External links
 
 

000879
Discoveries by Max Wolf
Named minor planets
19170722